The Advanced Imaging Society is an organization founded in 2009 to represent artistic and technical achievements featuring stereoscopic 3D in visual media, such as television and film. It was formed by several stakeholders: Walt Disney Studios Motion Pictures, DreamWorks Animation, Sony Pictures, Paramount Pictures, IMAX, Dolby, Panasonic, and MasterImage 3D. With the organization's partnership to People's Choice Awards, their members will do votes on their favorite films across all of its categories.

Awards
Since 2010, the Advanced Imaging Society has presented annual awards (Lumiere Awards; formerly known as 3D Creative Arts Awards) for technical achievements featuring stereoscopic 3D in film, television, and other media.

Categories

Best Feature Film – Live Action

Best Feature Film – Animation

Best 2D to 3D Conversion

Governor's Cinema Award
A special award used to signify the film's significant experience.

References

External links
 

Arts and media trade groups